Prassthanam is a 2019 Indian Hindi-language political action drama film directed by Deva Katta and produced by Maanayata Dutt under her own banner Sanjay S Dutt Productions. A remake of the 2010 Telugu-language film of the same name, the film stars Sanjay Dutt, Jackie Shroff, Manisha Koirala, Chunky Pandey, Ali Fazal, Satyajeet Dubey, and Amyra Dastur. The film follows a rural politician who favors his intelligent stepson as the heir to his throne, much to the disappointment of his own son who's hot-blooded and starts to rebel against his decision.

On 29 July 2019, Sanjay Dutt, the producer Manyata Dutt, and the director Deva Katta were sent a legal notice by Shemaroo Entertainment alleging they did not have the remake rights for the film and giving them three days to respond.

The film was released on 20 September 2019.

Plot 
Set in the backdrop of politics of Uttar Pradesh, Baldev Pratap Singh(Sanjay Dutt) is a four time MLA from Malihabad constituency. Baldev recently obtained a stay order against businessman Bajwa Khatri(Chunky Pandey), with which his popularity has soared and he is all set to win elections the fifth time. Majid Maqbool(Zakir Hussain) a leader in Baldev's political party is also in the fray and wishes to obtain party ticket for fighting elections from Malihabad constituency.

In a flashback of events, Baldev and Badshah(Jackie Shroff) are beating up the goons who challenge and insult Jaiprakash Kedar(M. K. Raina) in local village elections. Jaiprakash's son Shiv(Anup Soni) decides to fight in the village elections after his father quits the race due to communal politics. Shiv's political opponent Kishen Yadav kills him during a rally, after which Jaiprakash asks Baldev to marry his daughter-in-law Saroj(Manisha Koirala) and take care of Shiv's children Ayush(Ali Fazal) and Palak. Baldev and Badshah track down Kishen and his goons who are trying to escape the village, and kill them.

In the present day, Ayush works with Baldev and is the heir apparent to Baldev's political legacy. While Ayush is working with his step father, Palak has severed all ties with her mother and step father. Baldev and Saroj's son Vivaan (Satyajeet Dubey) is a hot headed brat who aspires to take over his father's political empire, but Baldev believes he is unfit for politics and should rather go abroad and study so that he can come back to run the family business. Badshah is Baldev's trusted lieutenant and he appoints his daughter Asma as the manager of his Hotel, as she has recently completed her MBA.

Majid blackmails the party officials and obtains the party ticket for Malihabad constituency so Baldev decides to fight the election as an independent. As elections are nearing, Baldev's enemies Majid and Bajwa have joined hands and make an unsuccessful assassination attempt on Baldev's life. Vivaan berates Baldev's party workers for their inability to stop the attack, Ayush publicly humiliates him for doing so. An angry Vivaan is seen drinking on the ledge of the hotel window where Asma is the manager. Asma sees this and thinks Vivaan is committing suicide and comes to save Vivaan, after which Vivaan in an intoxicated state attempts to rape her. While she is trying to resist, Vivaan forcibly ingests drugs into her and then goes to rape her. Asma, overdoses on the drugs, Vivaan and his friends in a state of panic meet with an accident on the way to get medical help. They all decide to burn the car and Asma's body in it so that nobody can find out that she was drugged and raped. Asma somehow manages to escape from the burning car but dies immediately after that and her body is found next day.

Vivaan is charged with Asma's murder and rape, which dents Baldev's chances of winning the elections. In the wake of his waning popularity due to Vivaan's criminal actions, Baldev is forced to join hands with Bajwa to ensure that he wins the election the fifth time. Meanwhile, Bajwa releases Vivaan from jail and conspires with him to take over his father's political legacy by eliminating Ayush. Baldev and Bajwa conspire to get Badshah eliminated. Vivaan unsuccessfully tries to kill Ayush, but kills Palak and her husband. Baldev tells Ayush to end the bloodshed and let Vivaan go. Ayush parts ways with Baldev, and beats up Vivaan and attempts to kill him but is unable to do so. Eventually Vivaan is killed by Badshah who also confesses to Ayush that Baldev had killed Shiv on the way to hospital to achieve his political ambitions. Ayush, Badshah and Baldev meet at Baldev's house and Baldev asks Ayush to kill him. Ayush decides not to kill him and leaves from the place, after which gunshots are heard.

Cast 

 Sanjay Dutt as Baldev Pratap Singh, Vivaan's father and Saroj's second husband    
 Jackie Shroff as Badshah Khan
 Ali Fazal as Ayushmann "Ayush" Shiv Kedar / Singh, Baldev's Step Son
 Manisha Koirala as Saroj Pratap Singh, Baldev's Wife
 Chunky Pandey as Don Bajwa Khatri
 Satyajeet Dubey as Vivaan Baldev Singh
 Amyra Dastur as Shivi 
 Zakir Hussain as Majid Maqbool
 M. K. Raina as Jaiprakash Kedar
 Anup Soni as Shiv Kedar, Jaiprakash's sonipat and Saroj's first husband (deceased) 
 Ishita Raj Sharma (special appearance in song "Dil Bevda")

Production

Development 
Dutt got interested to remake the Telugu film soon after it was released. After Dutt was released from jail approached the director of the original film Deva Katta, who said he got interested in the project due to Dutt's "intensity of interest from his side". The director stated that the team has not made significant changes from the original film. The film will mark the director's first Bollywood film as a director.

Casting 
When the director narrated the script Manisha Koirala accepted the film. The director of the film further added, "The kind of respect and camaraderie that they (Dutt and Manisha) share has added to the film and on screen it is magical to see it". When Jackie Shroff joined the project, the director said it's a dream come true for him. Sooraj Pancholi was chosen to play in the lead role was later replaced by Ali Fazal, due to his busy schedule for his next film.

Filming 
On 1 June 2018, on the occasion of Sanjay Dutt's late mother Nargis' 89th birth anniversary, Dutt announced the film to be produced. Filming began on 6 June the occasion Dutt's late father Sunil Dutt's 90th birth anniversary. Sanjay Dutt began shooting portions of the film in Lucknow.

Release 
The film was released on 20 September 2019.

Soundtrack 

The music of the film is composed by Ankit Tiwari, Farhad Samji and Vikram Montrose while lyrics are written by Farhad Samji, Atique Allahabadi, Shekhar Astitwa, Yash Eshawari and Anurag Bhomia.

Reception

Critical reception 

The Times of India gave 3 out of 5 stars stating "Prassthanam is a tried and tested political potboiler with power, greed and emotions at its core".

The Indian Express gave 2.5 out of 5 stars stating "Of the ensemble, in which Chunky Panday gets to wear a bad wig and vamp it up most enjoyably, Ali Fazal is the most impressive".

Box office 
Prassthanam collected 80 lakhs on the opening day and second day also  1.00 crore, whereas the third day collection was 1.25 crore, taking its total opening weekend collection to 30.5 million in India.

, with gross of 5.65 crore from India and 21 lakhs from overseas, the film has grossed 58.6 million worldwide.

References

External links 
 
 
 

2010s Hindi-language films
Hindi remakes of Telugu films
Films shot in Lucknow
Indian action films
Political action films
Films directed by Deva Katta
Films scored by Vikram Montrose
2019 action films